Bulbophyllum cylindrobulbum is a species of orchid in the genus Bulbophyllum. They are commonly found in New Guinea and in the Solomon Islands.

This species of orchid is particularly small, around 15 to 20 cm between each cylindrical pseudobulb.

References
The Bulbophyllum-Checklist
The Internet Orchid Species Photo Encyclopedia

cylindrobulbum